HSBC Sri Lanka is a banking and financial services company in Sri Lanka and is a licensed commercial bank supervised by the Central Bank of Sri Lanka. It is the largest and one of the oldest banks in Sri Lanka.  HSBC opened its doors in Sri Lanka in 1892, just 27 years after its first offices were established in Hong Kong and Shanghai. The company maintained an international outlook from the start, while its activities centered on trade finance.

References

External links

 
 

Banks of Sri Lanka